Machang Bubok (Jawi: ماڅڠ بوبوق) is a new village in Central Seberang Perai District, Penang, Malaysia.

As of date November 2011, the Machang Bubok village has 2134 people and 85% of the population consists of Chinese. About 12% of them are Malays and less than 3% are Indians. The major language spoken in this village is Hakka. This village has about 421 houses. Many city dwellers visit this village during holidays and festive seasons because the air is fresher and the food is delicious and inexpensive.

See also 
 Cherok Tok Kun
 Bukit Mertajam
 Kulim

References 

Central Seberang Perai District
Villages in Penang